St. Peter is an unincorporated community in Graham County, Kansas, United States.

History
The community was originally named Hoganville.  The post office in St. Peter, established in 1894 as Hoganville, was discontinued in 1920. The population in 1910 was 50.

Education
The community is served by Graham County USD 281 public school district.

References

Further reading

External links
 Graham County maps: Current, Historic, KDOT

Unincorporated communities in Graham County, Kansas
Unincorporated communities in Kansas